Hohenkirchen is a village in the municipality of Wangerland in district of Friesland in Lower Saxony. The village is the administrative center of the municipality of Wangerland, formed in 1971.

References

Friesland (district)
Villages in Lower Saxony